Dehiscence  can refer to:
 Dehiscence (botany), the spontaneous opening at maturity of a plant structure, such as a fruit, anther, or sporangium, to release its contents
 Wound dehiscence, a previously closed wound reopening
 Superior canal dehiscence, in which a new window opens up in the labyrinth of the inner ear, resulting in a form of vertigo
 Autothysis, a usually fatal, voluntary dehiscence used as a form of defense by ants, termites and other animals.
 Killian's dehiscence, a triangular area in the wall of the pharynx